The 2012 Newcastle Knights season was the 25th in the club's history. Coached by Wayne Bennett and captained by Kurt Gidley, they competed in the NRL's 2012 Telstra Premiership, finishing the regular season 12th (out of 16).

Milestones
Round 1: Darius Boyd made his debut for the club, after previously playing for the St. George Illawarra Dragons.
Round 1: Adam Cuthbertson made his debut for the club, after previously playing for the St. George Illawarra Dragons.
Round 1: Alex McKinnon made his debut for the club, after previously playing for the St. George Illawarra Dragons.
Round 3: Matt Hilder kicked his 1st goal for the club.
Round 4: Alex McKinnon scored his 1st try for the club.
Round 4: Timana Tahu played his 100th game for the club.
Round 6: Tyrone Roberts kicked his 1st career goal.
Round 8: Kurt Gidley scored his 1000th point for the club, which was also his 1000th career point.
Round 8: Willie Mason made his debut for the club, after previously playing for RC Toulonnais.
Round 10: Chris Adams made his NRL debut for the club.
Round 10: James McManus played his 100th game for the club, which was also his 100th career game.
Round 12: Tyrone Roberts scored his 1st career try.
Round 13: Chris Houston played his 100th career game.
Round 14: Dane Gagai made his debut for the club, after previously playing for the Brisbane Broncos and scored his 1st try for the club.
Round 14: Willie Mason scored his 1st try for the club.
Round 17: Kevin Naiqama scored his 1st career try.
Round 18: Kyle O'Donnell made his NRL debut for the club.
Round 19: Robbie Rochow made his debut for the club, after previously playing for the Melbourne Storm.
Round 19: Zeb Taia played his 100th career game.
Round 21: Darius Boyd scored his 1st try for the club.
Round 21: Robbie Rochow scored his 1st career try.
Round 25: Timana Tahu scored his 88th try for the club, breaking Adam MacDougall's record of 87 tries as the highest ever try-scorer for the Knights.
Round 25: Zeb Taia played his 100th game for the club.
Round 26: Neville Costigan played his 150th career game.

Squad

Transfers and Re-signings

Gains

Losses

Promoted juniors

Change of role

Re-signings

Player contract situations

Ladder

Jerseys and sponsors
In 2012, the Knights' jerseys were made by ISC and their major sponsor was Hunter Ports.

Fixtures

Pre-season trials

Regular season
2012 Regular season fixtures

Statistics

29 players used.

Source:

Representative honours

The following players appeared in a representative match in 2012.

Australia
Darius Boyd
Akuila Uate

Junior Kangaroos
Alex McKinnon (captain)
Korbin Sims

Junior Kiwis
Api Pewhairangi

New South Wales
Akuila Uate

New South Wales Country
James McManus
Jarrod Mullen

New South Wales Residents
Marvin Filipo
Kyle O'Donnell

New South Wales under-16s
Travis Edwards
Sione Mata'utia
Tevita Pangai Junior

New South Wales under-20s
Chanel Mata'utia
Alex McKinnon

NRL All Stars
Wayne Bennett (coach)
Kade Snowden

Prime Minister's XIII
Darius Boyd
Akuila Uate

Queensland
Darius Boyd

Queensland under-20s
Kurt Mann

Individual honours

Teams and squads
National Youth Competition (NYC) Team of the Year
Korbin Sims

New South Wales Cup Team of the Year
Marvin Filipo
Siuatonga Likiliki
Josh Mantellato
Rip Taylor (coach)

Dally M awards
Dally M Winger of the Year
Akuila Uate

Newcastle Knights awards

Player of the Year
National Rugby League (NRL) Player of the Year: Chris Houston
National Youth Competition (NYC) Player of the Year: Adam Clydsdale

Players' Player
National Rugby League (NRL) Players' Player: Danny Buderus
National Youth Competition (NYC) Players' Player: Adam Clydsdale

References

Newcastle Knights seasons
Newcastle Knights season